Ceroplesis reticulata is a species of beetle in the family Cerambycidae. It was described by Gahan in 1909. It is known from Uganda.

References

Endemic fauna of Uganda
reticulata
Beetles described in 1909